Kyi Lin (born 4 September 1989) is a Burmese professional footballer who plays as midfielder for the Myanmar national football team and club football with Yangon United  Kyi Lin is an influential player for the two-time Myanmar National League winners. He was included in Goal.com's Asian Best XI for October 2012 readers' choice for AFF player of the Year.

International goals 
Scores and results list Myanmar's goal tally first.

Honours

Club
Yangon United
Myanmar National League: 2011, 2012, 2013
MFF Cup: 2011

Individual
 MFF Player of the Year: 2012
 ASEAN Football Federation Best XI: 2013

References

1992 births
Living people
Sportspeople from Yangon
Burmese footballers
Myanmar international footballers
Yangon United F.C. players
Association football midfielders
Southeast Asian Games bronze medalists for Myanmar
Southeast Asian Games medalists in football
Competitors at the 2011 Southeast Asian Games

External links